Mark Rutherford may refer to:
Mark Rutherford (composer),musician, composer and producer
Hale White (1831–1913), writer who used the pen name Mark Rutherford
Mark Rutherford (footballer) (born 1972), English footballer
Mark Rutherford School, Bedford, England